Benjamin Robert Pugh (born 23 November 1989) is an English professional football manager who is the manager of the Cayman Islands National Football Team.

Coaching career 
In January 2019, Pugh was appointed assistant coach of the Cayman Islands. In July 2019, Pugh was appointed head coach of the Cayman Islands national team as well as the U23 Olympic team.

Pugh started his reign as senior head coach with two wins against the US Virgin Islands and Barbados in the CONCACAF Nations League Group C.

Managerial statistics

References 

1989 births
Sportspeople from Ipswich
Living people
English football managers
Cayman Islands national football team managers
Ipswich Town F.C. non-playing staff